The Ju-jitsu competition at the World Games 1997 took place on August 15 to August 17 in Lahti, Finland.

European Ju-Jitsu

Fighting System

Men's events

Women's events

Duo System

Duo Classic events

Links

References

External links
Medal winners on ju-jutsu.se (archive)

1997 World Games
1997